Martin Elfand (born 1937) is an American film producer. Born in Los Angeles, California. Elfand began his career as a talent agent with CMA, representing Candice Bergen and Al Pacino. He then developed a working relationship with Martin Bregman. Recently, he has been involved in a legal dispute with Warner Brothers over unpaid video royalties from many of his 70s and 80s hit films.

Producer credits
He was a producer in all films unless otherwise noted.

Film

References

American film producers
Living people
1937 births
People from Los Angeles